The Social Renewal Party is a political party in São Tomé and Príncipe. The party failed to win any seats in the National Assembly following elections held on 26 March 2006. It was part of the Uê Kédadji coalition.

The party supported Patrice Trovoada in the 30 July 2006 presidential election. He won 38.82% of the vote, finishing a distant second to the incumbent Fradique de Menezes, who received 60.58% of the vote.

Political parties in São Tomé and Príncipe